Gamboa Airport  is an airport serving Castro, a city on Chiloé Island in the Los Lagos Region of Chile.

The airport runs along the shoreline just south of Gamboa, and south approach and departures are over the water. Runway 34 has an additional  of unpaved overrun on the north end.

See also

Transport in Chile
List of airports in Chile

References

External links
OpenStreetMap - Gamboa
Aeródromo Gamboa (SCST) at Aerodromo.cl
OurAirports - Gamboa
FallingRain - Gamboa Airport

Airports in Los Lagos Region